Many Waters is a 1931 British romance film directed by Milton Rosmer and starring Lillian Hall-Davis, Arthur Margetson and Elizabeth Allan. The film was shot at the Elstree Studios of British International Pictures. It was based on the 1928 play of the same title by Monckton Hoffe. An elderly couple reminisce about the romantic adventures of their youth. It was the last film of actress Lillian Hall-Davis, a star of the silent era, who committed suicide in 1933.

Cast
 Lillian Hall-Davis as Mabel Barcaldine 
 Arthur Margetson as Jim Barcaldine 
 Elizabeth Allan as Freda Barcaldine 
 Donald Calthrop as Compton Hardcastle 
 Sam Livesey as Stanley Rosel 
 Mary Clare as Mrs. Rosel 
 Robert Douglas as Godfrey Marvin 
 Charles Carson as Henry Delauney 
 Ivan Samson as Philip Sales 
 Renée Macready as Dolly Sales 
 Herbert Lomas as Everett 
 Hay Petrie as Director 
 J. Fisher White as Gentleman 
 Monckton Hoffe as Registrar
 S.A. Cookson as Registrar of Marriage  
 Paul Gill as Doctor Sangster 
 Clare Greet as Registry Office Cleaner  
 Philip Hewland as Registry Office Clerk 
 David Miller as Mr. Clinchpole  
 Cicely Oates as  Registry Office Cleaner 
 Bill Shine as Registry Office Junior Clerk

References

Bibliography
 Low, Rachael. Filmmaking in 1930s Britain. George Allen & Unwin, 1985.
 Wood, Linda. British Films, 1927-1939. British Film Institute, 1986.

External links

1931 films
1930s romance films
British films based on plays
Films directed by Milton Rosmer
British black-and-white films
British romance films
Films shot at British International Pictures Studios
1930s English-language films
1930s British films
Films set in London
English-language romance films